Corymbia haematoxylon, commonly known as mountain marri, is a species of tree that is endemic to the south-west of Western Australia. It has rough, tessellated bark on the trunk and branches, lance-shaped to narrow egg-shaped adult leaves, flower buds in groups of seven, white flowers and urn-shaped fruit.

Description
It has rough, tessellated, brownish bark on the trunk and branches. Young plants and coppice regrowth have egg-shaped to broadly lance-shaped, petiolate leaves. Flowering occurs from October or December to January or March and the flowers are white.

Taxonomy and naming
Mountain marri was first formally described in 1914 by Joseph Maiden who gave it the name Eucalyptus haematoxylon and published the description in Journal and Proceedings of the Royal Society of New South Wales. In 1995 by Ken Hill and Lawrie Johnson changed the name to Corymbia haematoxylon.

Distribution and habitat
Corymbia haematoxylon grows in open forest on flats and slopes in sandy soil over sandstone or laterite. It occurs in scattered populations on the western Darling Range between Byford and Capel with a disjunct population near Mount Lesueur. The tree is associated with marri (Corymbia calophylla) woodland and resembles a miniature version of that species.

References

haematoxylon
Rosids of Western Australia
Drought-tolerant trees
Myrtales of Australia
Plants described in 1914